The American Journal of Cancer Research is a medical journal established in 2011. It covers all areas of clinical oncology and experimental cancer research and publishes review articles, original articles, and editorials. It is published by e-Century Publishing Corporation. The editor-in-chief is Dr. Mien-Chie Hung. The journal is abstracted and indexed in the Science Citation Index Expanded. According to the Journal Citation Reports, the journal has a 2021 impact factor of 6.166.

References

External links 
 

Publications established in 2011
Oncology journals
Creative Commons Attribution-licensed journals
English-language journals
E-Century Publishing Corporation academic journals